Ebun Comets is a Nigerian professional basketball club. The club currently competes in the NBBF National Division One, the top flight league in the country. They have won one national championship, in 2003, 2005 and 2007. In 2006, they played In the FIBA Africa Club Champions Cup, where they finished 5th. On July 14, 2021, they won the inaugural season of the Crown Elite Basketball League. Until 2006, the team was based in the city of Akure in the Ondo State.

Honours 
Nigerian Premier League

 Champions (3): 2003, 2005, 2007
NBBF National Division One

 Runners-up (1): 2021

Crown Elite Basketball Championship

 Champions (1): 2021
FIBA Africa Cup Winners' Cup

 Runner-up (1): 2001

References

External links
Africa-Basket.com Team Page

Basketball teams in Nigeria